Harry James Lincoln aka Harry Jay Lincoln (13 April 1878 Shamokin, Pennsylvania – 19 April 1937 Philadelphia) was a music composer from Williamsport, Pennsylvania.

Career 
Aside from running his own publication company, he wrote many marches and rags, such as the Bees Wax Rag (1911), the Lincoln Highway two step march (1921), and quite possibly the Repasz Band March (1901).  This last composition, created for the local Repasz Band of Williamsport, Pennsylvania (founded in 1831 and currently the oldest brass band still in existence in the United States), has also been credited to its trombonist Charles C. Sweeley; however, evidence indicates that Sweeley had bought rights to the march from Lincoln.

Pseudonyms 
Lincoln often used several pseudonyms, a common practice for composers who published in their own firm. His pseudonyms included:

 Thomas Casele
 Ben E. Crosby
 James L. Dempsey
 I. Furman-Mulliner
 James L. Harlin
 Frederick M. Holmes
 Harry Jay
 Joseph Kiefer
 Abe Losch ("Losch" was the maiden name of his mother)
 Carl Loveland
 Carl L. Loveland
 Gay A. Rimert
 Lillian H. Sarver
 Chas. C. Sweeley
 Caird M. Vandersloot
 Carl D. Vandersloot
 F. W. Vandersloot
 Jesse Westover
 Frederick Williams

Death 
Lincoln died on April 19, 1937, at the age of 59.

Selected compositions 

 "A Jolly Sailor"
 "Alameda Waltzes" (1908)
 "American Emblem" (1923)
 "Bang Up Two Step" (1913)
 "Bees Wax Rag" (1911) (Audio recording)
 "Belle of the Season" (1924)
 "Blaze of Honour" (1915)
 "Buffalo Flyer"
 "Canonade" (1928)
 "Circus Life" (1914)
 "Dance Of The Fairies" (1912)
 "Dixie A Rag Caprice" (1911)
 "Dreaming at Twilight" (1915)
 "Dreamy Swanee Lullaby" (1917)(a collaboration of Lincoln and George C. Pennington)
 "Emblem of Peace" (1923)
 "Empire Express"
 "Excuse Me But Isn't Your Name Johnson?" (1907)
 "Ferns and Flowers"
 "Flowers of the Forest"
 "Garden of Lilies" (1913)
 "Girls of America" (1923)
 Glory of Womanhood (1917)
 Heaven's Artillery: March Two Step (1904)
 "Midnight Fire Alarm" (1900) 
 "Midnight Special"
 "Palm Limited
 "Sunset Limited" (1910)
 "Halley's Comet Rag" (1910)
 "The Iron Division" (1919)

Family 
Lincoln married Lottie May Bovee (maiden) June 14, 1898, in Elmira, New York.  They had two children:
 Margaret Emily Lincoln Walther (born to their marriage; 1904–1933), and
 Harry Jay Lincoln, Jr. (adopted; 1929–1952)

See also
 Vandersloot Music Publishing Company

References

General references 

The Heritage Encyclopedia of Band Music, Composers and their music, (Vol. 3 of 3; Supplement), by William H. Rehrig (né William Harold Rehrig; born 1939), edited by Paul Edmund Bierley (1926–1916), Integrity Press, Westerville, Ohio (1996);

Inline citations

External links
Sheet music for "Repasz Band: March and Two Step", Vandersloot Music Co., 1904.
 
 

1878 births
1937 deaths
American male composers
American composers
People from Shamokin, Pennsylvania